Julien is a former French automobile manufacturer.   The Paris based Société des Études Automobiles M. A. Julien presented its first prototype in 1946 and automaking activities came to an end in 1949, probably without any of the developments having progressed beyond the prototype stage.

History
These were the Julien MM5 and the Julien VUP. During the following twelve months Julien negotiated successfully with the government, who controlled the necessary materials supplies, for permission to put the MM5 into production.

The car
The rear track was strikingly narrower than that at the front, but the car did have four wheels and power was delivered via a three-speed manual transmission to the rear axle.

References
 G.N. Georgano: Autos. Encyclopédie complète. 1885 à nos jours. Courtille, 1975 (In French)

External links 
Internet site of the GTÜ
"True father of the VW Beetle concept" – Internet site stating that the Julien project received input from Josef Ganz
Photo of Julien MM5

Defunct motor vehicle manufacturers of France
Car manufacturers of France
Manufacturing companies based in Paris